Alkalihalobacillus macyae is a Gram-positive and motile bacterium from the genus of Alkalihalobacillus which has been isolated from a gold mine in Australia.

References

Bacillaceae
Bacteria described in 2004